Homewerk is a 12" vinyl EP by Luke Vibert. All songs were later included on the album Lover's Acid.

Track listing
Side A
"Homewerk" - 4:34
"Acid 2000" - 3:42
Side B
"Cash 'n' Carry Acid" - 4:21
"Come On Chaos" - 5:26

2002 EPs
Luke Vibert EPs